The 2020–21 Southern Football League season was the 118th in the history of the Southern League since its establishment in 1894. The league has two Premier divisions (Central and South) at Step 3 of the National League System (NLS) and two Division One divisions (Central and South) at Step 4. These correspond to levels 7 and 8 of the English football league system. 

The allocations for Steps 3 and 4 for season 2020–21 were announced by the FA on 21 July 2020.

Due to the restrictions on clubs' ability to play matches in the lockdowns associated with the COVID-19 pandemic, competitions at Steps 3–6 were curtailed on 24 February 2021. The scheduled restructuring of non-league took place at the end of the season, with a new division to be added to Northern Premier League at step 4 for 2021–22, which resulted in some reallocations into or out of, and promotions to, the Southern League's Step 4 divisions.

Premier Division Central

The Premier Division Central comprised the same set of 22 teams which competed in the aborted competition the previous season.

League table

Results

Stadia and locations

Premier Division South

The Premier Division South comprised 20 teams, two fewer than the previous season, following Blackfield & Langley's resignation and voluntary relegation to the Wessex League, and Merthyr Town's decision to withdraw for one season due to the effects of the COVID-19 pandemic in Wales.

League table

Results

Stadia and locations

Division One Central

Division One Central comprised the same set of 20 teams which competed in the aborted competition the previous season.

League table

Results

Stadia and locations

Division One South

Division One South comprised the same set of 20 teams which competed in the aborted competition the previous season.

League table

Results

Stadia and locations

See also
 Southern Football League
 2020–21 Isthmian League
 2020–21 Northern Premier League

References

External links
Official website

Southern Football League seasons
7
Eng
Eng